P. Vietti (date of birth unknown, died 1917) was a footballer who played for FC Basel in the early 1910s. He played as goalkeeper.

Vietti joined Basel's first team for their 1912–13 season under player-coach Ernst Kaltenbach. Vietti played his domestic league debut for the club in the home game in the Landhof on 13 October 1912 as Basel were defeated 1–3 against local rivals Nordstern Basel. He played his last game for the team in the home game on 6 April 1913 as Basel played a 2–2 draw against FC Bern.

In his one season with the club Vietti played a total of 12 games for Basel. All 12 of these games were in the Serie A - Zentralschweiz.

References

Sources
 Rotblau: Jahrbuch Saison 2017/2018. Publisher: FC Basel Marketing AG. 
 Die ersten 125 Jahre. Publisher: Josef Zindel im Friedrich Reinhardt Verlag, Basel. 
 Verein "Basler Fussballarchiv" Homepage
(NB: Despite all efforts, the editors of these books and the authors in "Basler Fussballarchiv" have failed to be able to identify all the players, their date and place of birth or date and place of death, who played in the games during the early years of FC Basel)

FC Basel players
Association football goalkeepers
Swiss Super League players
1917 deaths